Liberty  is an unincorporated community in Pickens County, Alabama, United States.

Liberty was once home to Liberty High School, but the school closed in 1967.

References

Unincorporated communities in Pickens County, Alabama
Unincorporated communities in Alabama